General Salipada K. Pendatun, officially the Municipality of General Salipada K. Pendatun (Maguindanaon: Inged nu General Salipada K. Pendatun; Iranun: Inged a General Salipada K. Pendatun), is a 4th class municipality in the province of Maguindanao del Sur, Philippines. According to the 2020 census, it has a population of 31,263 people.

It is named for General Salipada K. Pendatun (1912 – 1985), who is a forerunner Mindanaoan Legislator and General during the Second World War.

History
On April 7, 1991, Muslim Mindanao Autonomy Act No. 3 created the Municipality of General S. K. Pendatun out of the municipality of Buluan, making it the first local government unit created by the ARMM Regional Assembly. The municipality of Paglat was created out of four of its barangays on September 29, 2001.

Geography

Barangays
General Salipada K. Pendatun is politically subdivided into 19 barangays.
Badak
Bulod
Kaladturan
Kulasi
Lao-lao
Lasangan
Lower Idtig
Lumabao
Makainis
Midconding
Midpandacan
Panosolen
Pidtiguian
Quipolot
Ramcor
Sadangin
Sumakubay
Tonggol
Upper Lasangan

Climate

Demographics

Economy

References

External links
 General Salipada K. Pendatun Profile at the DTI Cities and Municipalities Competitive Index
 MMA Act No. 3 : An Act Creating the Municipality of General Salipada K. Pendatun in the Province of Maguindanao
 [ Philippine Standard Geographic Code]
 Philippine Census Information
 Local Governance Performance Management System

Municipalities of Maguindanao del Sur